The Socialist Federal Republic of Yugoslavia (SFRY) was a socialist country that existed in the second half of the 20th century. Being socialist meant that strict technology import rules and regulations shaped the development of computer history in the country, unlike in the Western world. However, since it was a non-aligned country, it had no ties to the Soviet Bloc either. One of the major ideas contributing to the development of any technology in SFRY was the apparent need to be independent of foreign suppliers for spare parts, fueling domestic computer development.

Development

Early computers
In former Yugoslavia, at the end of 1962 there were 30 installed electronic computers, in 1966, there were 56, and in 1968 there were 95.
Having received training in the European computer centres (Paris 1954 and 1955, Darmstadt 1959, Wien 1960, Cambridge 1961 and London 1964), engineers from the BK.Institute-Vinča and the Mihailo Pupin Institute-  Belgrade, led by Prof. dr Tihomir Aleksić, started a project of designing the first "domestic" digital computer at the end of the 1950s. This was to become a line of CER, starting with the model CER-10 in 1960, a primarily vacuum tube and electronic relays-based computer.

By 1964, CER-20 computer was designed and completed as "electronic bookkeeping machine", as the manufacturer recognized increasing need in accounting market. This special-purpose trend continued with the release of CER-22 in 1967, which was intended for on-line "banking" applications.

There were more CER models, such as CER-11, CER-12, and CER-200, but there is currently little information here available on them.

In the late 1970s, "Ei-Niš Računarski Centar" from Niš, Serbia, started assembling Mainframe computers H6000 under Honeywell license, mainly for banking businesses. Computer initially had a great success that later led into local limited parts production. In addition, the company produced models such as H6 and H66 and was alive as late as early 2000s under name "Bull HN". Models H6 were installed in enterprises (e.g., telecom) for business applications and ran the GCOS operating system. Also, they were used in education. E.g., one of the built Honeywell H6 was installed in local electronics engineering and trade school "Nikola Tesla" in Niš and was used for training and educational purposes until late 80s and dawn of personal computers.

Imports
Eventually, the socialist government of SFRY allowed foreign computers to be imported under strict conditions. This led to the increasing dominance of foreign mainframes and a continuous reduction of relative market share for domestic products.

Despite this, since the interest in computer technology grew overall, systems built by the Mihailo Pupin Institute (first CER, then TIM lines) and Iskra Delta (e.g. model 800, derivative of PDP-11/34) continued to evolve through the 1970s and even the 1980s.

Early 1980s: Home computer era
Many companies attempted to produce microcomputers similar to 1980s home computers, such as Ivo Lola Ribar Institute's Lola 8, M.Pupin Institute's TIM-001, EI's Pecom 32 and 64, PEL Varaždin's Galeb (computer) and Orao, Ivel Ultra and Ivel Z3, etc. Jožef Stefan Institute in Ljubljana made first 16-bit microcomputer PMP-11 under the leadership of Marijan Miletić, former technical director of Iskra-Delta in 1984.  It had 8 MHz DEC T-11 CPU, maximum of 64 kB RAM, 10 MB hard disk, 8" diskette and two RS-232 ports for VT-100 video terminal and COM.  Branko Jevtić modified RT-11 operating system so plenty of DEC-11 applications were available.  Some 50 machines were made before IBM AT became widely available.  Many factors caused them to fail or not even attempt to enter the home computer market:

 they were prohibitively expensive for individuals (especially when compared to popular foreign ZX Spectrum, Commodore 64, etc.);
 lack of entertainment and other software meant they were not appealing to majority of contemporary computer enthusiasts;
 they were not available in stores.

The end result was that domestic computers were predominantly used in government institutions that were prohibited from purchasing imported equipment. Those computers that could have been connected to existing mainframes and used as terminals were more successful in business environments, while others were used as educational tools in schools. Given that all medium and large enterprises in the country were government-owned, this was still a significant part of the domestic market which explains both the unnatural, relative success of domestic business computers, as well as why IBM PC/AT and compatibles had a low influx in the local business market.

However, while the government tried to proliferate domestic home computers by introducing the cost and memory size limitations for imports, many people imported them nevertheless either illegally or by dividing a single computer into pieces that separately fit within prescribed restrictions. Lack of proper legislation and such grey market activity only helped the demise of domestic home computer production. By the middle of the decade home computer market was, much like in the rest of the Europe, dominated by Commodore 64 and ZX Spectrum as a runner up.

One domestic microcomputer model managed to stand out - Galaksija. Created by Voja Antonić, the entire do-it-yourself diagrams and instructions were published in the special issue of popular science magazine "Galaksija" called Računari u vašoj kući (Computers in your home) in January 1984. Although initially unavailable for purchase in assembled form, more than 1,000 enthusiasts built the microcomputer for games. Many were later produced for use in some schools.

Home computers were widely popular in SFRY - so much so that software (otherwise recorded on Compact Cassette) was broadcast by radio stations (e.g. Ventilator 202, Radio Študent Ljubljana etc.). Due to lack of regulation, copyright infringement of software was common and unlicensed copies for sale were freely advertised in popular computer magazines of the time, such as Računari, Svet kompjutera, Moj Mikro and Revija za mikroračunala. This distribution led to essentially every home computer owner having access to hundreds, if not thousands of commercial software titles. This would later cause benefits and drawbacks for the economy. Several student developers became computer experts since cheap and unauthorized development tools were common. However, they found themselves still competing with these warez domestically after trying to find a market for their skills.

Late 1980s: PC era
The second half of the 1980s saw the rise of popularity of IBM AT compatible among business users, and a slow movement towards 16-bits like Amiga and Atari ST computers in the enthusiast market, while mainstream home computing was still largely dominated by the ubiquitous C-64. Domestic computer hardware manufacturers produced a number of different IBM AT compatibles, such as TIM-microcomputers and Lira, and the first domestic Unix workstation (in one of the configurations, Iskra Delta's Triglav was shipped with Microsoft's Xenix) but their success was again limited to government-controlled companies that were required to purchase only domestic or legally imported technology.

Timeline

1959
 Branko Souček leads a team from 1955 to 1959 to create the '256 channel analyzer' digital computer at the Ruđer Bošković Institute
1960
  Mihajlo Pupin Institute releases first digital computer in SFRY - CER-10.

1964
  Mihajlo Pupin Institute releases CER-20 - "electronic bookkeeping machine" model.

1966
  Mihajlo Pupin Institute releases a serie of minicomputers CER-200.

1967
  Mihajlo Pupin Institute releases CER-22 - "digital computer for on-line banking applications".

1971
  Mihajlo Pupin Institute releases hybrid computer systems HRS-100 for AN.USSR, Moscow.
  Mihajlo Pupin Institute releases CER-12 computer system for business data processing in ERCs.
  Mihajlo Pupin Institute releases CER-203.

1979
 Iskradata releases Iskradata 1680

1980
 Ivo Lola Ribar Institute releases industrial programmable logic controller PA512

1983
 Mihajlo Pupin Institute releases "computer system for real-time generation of images" and a model TIM-001
 Iskra Delta releases Iskra Delta Partner Z80A-based computer
 Complete build-it-yourself new instructions for Galaksija (en. Galaxy) computer are published in Racunari u vašoj kući magazine.

1984
 Iskra Delta releases Iskra Delta 800 computer derived from Digital PDP-11/34
 Institute Jozef Stefan releases PMP-11 16-bit microcomputer compatible with DEC RT-11 OS
 PEL Varaždin releases Galeb (en. seagull) computer later to be replaced by Orao

1985
 Mihajlo Pupin Institute releases "Microprocessor post-office computers" serie TIM-100.
 Mihajlo Pupin Institute releases an application development microcomputer model TIM-001.
 PEL Varaždin releases Orao (en. eagle) computer for use in schools
 Galaksija Plus (enhanced version of Galaksija) is released.
 Elektronska Industrija Niš releases Pecom 32 and Pecom 64 also for use in some schools.
 Ivo Lola Ribar Institute announced official release of Lola 8 for an exhibition in 1985.

1986
 Ivo Lola Ribar Institute releases industrial programmable logic controller LPA512.
 Energoinvest IRIS releases IRIS PC-16.

1988
 Mihajlo Pupin Institute releases 32-bit microcomputer systems  TIM-600.
 Mihajlo Pupin Institute releases HD64180-based TIM-011 microcomputer integrated with green monochrome monitor, for use in many Serbian secondary schools.

See also
 List of computer systems from Yugoslavia
 History of computer hardware in Eastern Bloc countries

Notes and references

Yugoslavia
Socialist Federal Republic of Yugoslavia
Computer companies of Yugoslavia